Great Isaac Lighthouse is a lighthouse on the small Bahamian island of Great Isaac Cay. Erected in 1859, it is located about  NNE of the Bimini Islands, and accessible only by boat. The lighthouse stands about 151 feet (46 m) tall.

On August 4, 1969, the station was discovered to have been abandoned by its two keepers, who were never found. Many believers in the Bermuda Triangle claim that the keepers were two more victims lost to its mysterious forces.  However, the hurricane record from 1969 indicates that Hurricane Anna, the first hurricane of 1969, on 1–2 August, passed close enough to Great Isaac Island to cause dangerous weather for the tiny rock island. By the 4th of August, the hurricane was well into the Atlantic Ocean.

The grounds are open to the public, although the lighthouse itself has had stairs removed to block access to the interior of that structure.  The keepers’ house, cistern, and assorted buildings are crumbling into ruins.  The derelict collection of abandoned buildings make Great Isaac Cay a popular destination for boaters.

See also
 List of lighthouses in the Bahamas

References

Lighthouses in the Bahamas